Submers is an album by Canadian musician Scott Morgan under the alias of Loscil. It was released in 2002 by Kranky.

Production and style
Large portions of the music on Submbers was from classical music that had been sampled and distorted by Morgan. AllMusic described the sound on Submbers as not being very different from than Morgan's previous album Triple Point,  noting that the "only significant difference is the emphasis on waves of rhythm over thumps and pulses."

Each track on Submers is named after a submarine. These ranged from early submarines such as the Gymnote to the Russian submarine Kursk (K-141).

Release
Submers was released by Kranky via compact disc on November 4, 2002. The album was reissued on vinyl for the first time on November 23, 2018 by Kranky.

Reception

AllMusic gave the album four and a half stars out of five, stating that the album "tops Morgan's impressive debut and provides further proof that the field of ambient techno continues to have plenty to offer" Pitchfork Media gave the album an 8.0 rating out of a possible 10, noting that "the delicate touches are what really make it." Exclaim! praised the album for "spellbinding songs and creating a continuously absorbing record" and that "Submers resonates with remarkable elegance from its opening tones to its closing echoes"

Reviewing the reissue in 2018, Rob Nay of Exclaim! noted that "These low end-heavy grooves sound perfectly aquatic on wax; kudos are in order for Kranky, who have polished up an already glistening gem for further appreciation."

Track listing
All songs composed and produced by Scott Morgan.
 "Argonaut I" – 7:07
 "Gymnote" – 5:57
 "Mute" – 7:30
 "Nautilus" – 6:59
 "Diable Marin" – 4:13
 "Resurgam" – 7:35
 "Le Plongeur" – 7:07
 "Triton" – 6:43
 "Kursk" – 7:10

Credits
Credits adapted from the album's sleeve.
 Scott Morgan – composer, producer, music
 Emplus Creative Solutions – cover design

See also
 2002 in music

Notes

2002 albums
Loscil albums
Kranky albums